Olczak is a surname. Notable people with the surname include: 

 Arek Olczak (born 1963), Australian wrestler
 Jacek Olczak (born 1965), Polish businessman
 Joanna Olczak-Ronikier (born 1934), Polish writer
 Marta Olczak (born 1994), Polish figure skater

See also
 Olczyk